Pamenahalli is a village in Harihara Taluk in Davangere District of Karnataka State, India. It comes under Sarathi Panchayath. It belongs to Bangalore Division. It is located 17 km towards west from District headquarters Davanagere. 298 km from State capital Bangalore.

Pamenahalli village is located in Harihar Tehsil of Davanagere district in Karnataka, India. It is situated 9 km from Harihar and 23 km from Davanagere. In 2009, Sarati was the gram panchayat of Pamenahalli village. The total geographical area of village is 151.66 hectares. Pamenahalli has a total population of 672, living in 129 houses. It contains a school which provides primary and middle schooling, and a post office. The most commonly spoke language is that of the Kannada people.

Nearby settlements
Pamenahalli is surrounded by Ranebennur Taluk towards North, Davanagere Taluk towards East, Honnali Taluk towards South, Hirekerur Taluk towards west. Davanagere, Ranibennur, Shikapur, Shimoga are the nearby Cities to Pamenahalli. This Place is in the border of the Davangere District and Haveri District. Haveri District, Ranebennur is North towards this place.

Transport 
The nearest railway access is at Harihar railway station. 14°35'35.7"N 75°48'56.9"E are the geographical coordinates of the village

References 

Villages in Davanagere district